The Grand Tour Game is an episodic racing video game developed and published by Amazon Game Studios with additional support being provided by Heavy Iron Studios. The title was released for the PlayStation 4 and Xbox One. It is based on the Amazon Prime series The Grand Tour. It covers the first episode of Series 1 and Series 2 and released a new episode of the game simultaneously with each episode of Series 3. This is Amazon's first video game for the two consoles.

The game was first announced on 21 August 2018 by Amazon and later on DriveTribe, and over the coming months, several trailers were released. The game was launched on 15 January 2019, three days before the third season was due to start on Amazon Prime.

In June 2020, the game was delisted from the PlayStation Store, Xbox Games Store and Amazon. The reason stated by Amazon was so the developers could 'focus our efforts and resources on other projects.' It was also announced that all bonus content such as the Pre-order and Twitch Prime vehicles would expire on 31 July 2020.

Gameplay 
The game allows the player to experience an episode of The Grand Tour, but some sections of the program are replaced with 'Scenes', challenges which the player completes. The aim of the game is to collect medals from the Scenes, awarded based on the performance of the player. These rewards, from best to worst, are the Gold Medal, Silver Medal, Bronze Medal and The 'Toilet Flush', if the game deems the performance particularly poor. Scenes usually involve driving the cars which appear in The Grand Tours episodes, in doing various challenges (like racing or top speed targets). However, some challenges involve taking a photo, completing a puzzle, or in the episode 'Pick Up Put Downs' the player can control a certain gun. Most episodes have between 14 and 15 Scenes, although this varies dramatically for some episodes.

Most Scenes are similar to what happens in their respective episodes, although some Scenes have been altered or omitted due to licensing restrictions. For example, the segments from Series 3, Episode 10, where James May drives the Toyota Yaris GRMN, or when Jeremy Clarkson drives the McLaren Senna are not available in the game. The Jaguar XE SV Project 8 from Series 4 Episode 6 was replaced by 'The Popmobile', which was supposed to be a Project 8, but wrapped in bubble wrap. This was also due to licensing issues. The game features voice-overs from the presenters Jeremy Clarkson, Richard Hammond and James May, as well as from professional driver Abbie Eaton. Alongside the single-player mode, the game also has a local multiplayer split-screen mode where 1-4 people can race with cars of their choice on the various tracks in the game.

Episodes

Series 1

Series 2

Series 3

Reception 

On the review website Metacritic, the game was awarded a score of 52/100 for the PlayStation 4 and the Xbox One, indicating "mixed or average reviews".

The game received praise for the diverse list of vehicles featured, many of which were exclusive to The Grand Tour Game, the track locations,  appeal to fans of the show, gadgets available to use and the transitions between the episodes and gameplay. However, the controls and dated graphical appearance were criticised. Despite this, fans of the show gave the game mostly positive reviews.

Martyn Stanley of DriveTribe, which was founded by The Grand Tour presenters Clarkson, May, and Hammond, gave the game four stars out of five, commenting that "merged media is a really interesting idea."

Notes

References

External links 
 Official website

Racing video games
2019 video games
PlayStation 4 games
Xbox One games
Video games based on television series
Video games developed in the United States
Multiplayer and single-player video games
Amazon Game Studios games
The Grand Tour (TV series)